The Eastern world, also known as the East or historically the Orient, is an umbrella term for various cultures or social structures, nations and philosophical systems, which vary depending on the context. It most often includes at least part of Asia or, geographically, the countries and cultures east of Europe, the Mediterranean region and the Arab world, specifically in historical (pre-modern) contexts, and in modern times in the context of Orientalism. It is often seen as a counterpart to the Western world, and correlates strongly to the southern half of the North–South divide.

The various regions included in the term are varied, hard to generalize, and do not have a single shared common heritage. Although the various parts of the Eastern world share many common threads, most notably being in the "Global South", they have never historically defined themselves collectively. The term originally had a literal geographic meaning, referring to the eastern part of the Old World, contrasting the cultures and civilizations of Asia with those of Europe (or the Western world). Traditionally, this includes all of Central Asia, East Asia, the Middle East, Transcaucasia, South Asia, and Southeast Asia.

Conceptually, the boundary between east and west is cultural, rather than geographical, as a result of which Australia and New Zealand, which were founded as British settler colonies, are typically grouped with the Western world despite being geographically closer to the Eastern world, while the Central Asian nations of the former Soviet Union, even with significant Western influence, are grouped in the East. Other than much of Asia and Africa, Europe has absorbed almost all of the societies of Oceania, North Asia and the Americas into the Western world because of settler colonization.

Countries such as Israel, and the Philippines, which are geographically located in the Eastern world, may be considered Westernized in some aspects of their society, culture and politics due to immigration and historical cultural influences from the United States and Europe.

Overview 

As with other regions of the world, Asia consists of many different, extremely diverse countries, ethnic groups and cultures. This concept is further debated because in some English-speaking countries, common vernacular associates the "Asian" identity to people of East Asian origin, while in some countries the "Asian" identity is associated with people of South Asian origin, and in other contexts, Asian regions such as the Indian subcontinent are included with Eastern Asia. Western Asia (which includes Israel, part of the Arab world, Iran, etc.), which may or may not see themselves part of the Eastern world, are sometimes considered "Middle Eastern" and separate from Asia. 

The division between 'East' and 'West', formerly referred to as Orient and Occident, is a product of European cultural history and of the distinction between Christian Europe and the cultures beyond it to the East. With the European colonization of the Americas, the East-West dichotomy became global. The concept of an Eastern, "Indian" (Indies) or "Oriental" sphere was emphasized by ideas of racial as well as religious and cultural differences. Such distinctions were articulated by Westerners in the scholarly tradition known as Orientalism and Indology. Orientalism has been the only Western conception of a unified Eastern world not limited to any specific region(s), but rather all of Asia together.

Culture 

While there is no singular Eastern culture of the Eastern world, there are subgroups within it, such as countries within East Asia, Southeast Asia, or South Asia, as well as syncretism within these regions. These include the spread of Eastern religions such as Buddhism or Hinduism, the usage of Chinese characters or Brahmic scripts, language families, the fusion of cuisines, and traditions, among others.

See also 

 Arab world
 Asia-Pacific
 Buddhism by country
 Christendom
 Continental union
 East Asian cultural sphere
 East–West dichotomy
 Far East
 Globalization
 Global North and Global South
 Greater India
 Greater Iran
 Greater Middle East
 Hinduism by country
 Muslim world
 Near East
 Western world
 Westernization

References 

Modern civilizations
Asia-Pacific
Country classifications
Cultural concepts
Cultural regions
Eastern culture